L'ambizione delusa is a 1742 comic opera by Leonardo Leo. The plot concerns Lupino and his sister Cintia, rural poor suddenly rich who are taught by the maid Delfina to behave like "posh" people.

Recordings
L'ambizione delusa - Lupino – Riccardo Gagliardi (tenor), Cintia – Michela Antenucci (soprano) Delfina – Filomena Diodati (soprano), Ciaccone – Giampiero Cicino (baritone), Foresto – Candida Guida (alto),  Laurina – Alessia Martino (mezzo), Silvio – Federica Carnevale (mezzo). Orchestra ICO of Magna Grecia di Taranto, conducted Antonio Greco Dynamic. Recorded live at the  39th Valle d'Itria Festival, Martina Franca, in 2013

References

1742 operas
Operas by Leonardo Leo
Operas